William Franklyn is an actor.

William Franklyn may also refer to:

William Franklyn (British Army officer) (1856–1914), British general
William Franklyn (priest) (1480?–1556), Dean of Windsor

See also
William Franklin (disambiguation)